Edward Sheppard (2 March 1891 – 23 December 1962) was an English cricketer. He played for Gloucestershire between 1921 and 1922.

References

1891 births
1962 deaths
English cricketers
Gloucestershire cricketers
Cricketers from Bristol